Hyalomis platyleuca is a species of moth in the subfamily Arctiinae. It was described by Francis Walker in 1854. It is found in Venezuela.

References

Euchromiina
Moths described in 1854